Oleksandr Tarasenko may refer to:

 Oleksandr Tarasenko (footballer, born 1978), Ukrainian football defender
 Oleksandr Tarasenko (footballer, born 1985), Ukrainian football midfielder
 Oleksandr Tarasenko (basketball) (born 1996), Ukrainian basketball player